Christopher Latham Sholes (February 14, 1819February 17, 1890) was an American inventor who invented the QWERTY keyboard, and, along with Samuel W. Soule, Carlos Glidden and John Pratt, has been contended to be one of the inventors of the first typewriter in the United States. He was also a newspaper publisher and Wisconsin politician.  In his time, Sholes went by the names C. Latham Sholes, Latham Sholes, or C. L. Sholes, but never "Christopher Sholes" or "Christopher L. Sholes".

Youth and political career 
Born in Mooresburg, in Montour County, Pennsylvania, Sholes moved to nearby Danville and worked there as an apprentice to a printer. After completing his apprenticeship, Sholes moved to Milwaukee, Wisconsin, in 1837, and later to Southport, Wisconsin (present-day Kenosha). On February 4, 1841 in Green Bay, he married Mary Jane McKinney of that town.
 
He became a newspaper publisher and politician, serving in the Wisconsin State Senate from 1848 to 1849 as a Democrat, in the Wisconsin State Assembly from 1852 to 1853 as a Free Soiler, and again in the Senate as a Republican from 1856 to 1857. He was instrumental in the successful movement to abolish capital punishment in Wisconsin; his newspaper, The Kenosha Telegraph, reported on the trial of John McCaffary in 1851, and then in 1853 he led the campaign in the Wisconsin State Assembly. He was the younger brother of Charles Sholes (1816–1867), who was also a newspaper publisher and politician who served in both houses of the Wisconsin State Legislature and as mayor of Kenosha.

The "Voree Record" 
In 1845, Sholes was working as editor of the Southport Telegraph, a small newspaper in Kenosha. During this time, he heard about the alleged discovery of the Voree Record, a set of three minuscule brass plates unearthed by James J. Strang, a would-be successor to Joseph Smith, founder of the Latter Day Saint movement.  Strang asserted that this proved that he was a true prophet of God, and he invited the public to call upon him and see the plates for themselves. Sholes accordingly visited Strang, examined his "Voree Record," and wrote an article about their meeting. He indicated that while he could not accept Strang's plates or his prophetic claims, Strang himself seemed to be "honest and earnest" and his disciples were "among the most honest and intelligent men in the neighborhood." As for the "record" itself, Sholes indicated that he was "content to have no opinion about it."

Inventing the typewriter 

Typewriters with various keyboards had been invented as early as 1714 by Henry Mill and have been reinvented in various forms throughout the 1800s. It is believed that Sholes drew inspiration from the inventions of others, including those of Frank Haven Hall, Samuel W. Soule, Carlos Glidden, Giuseppe Ravizza and, in particular, John Pratt, whose mention in an 1867 Scientific American article Glidden is known to have shown Sholes.  Sholes' typewriter improved on both the simplicity and efficiency of previous models, which led to his successful patent and commercial success.

Sholes had moved to Milwaukee and became the editor of a newspaper. Following a strike by compositors at his printing press, he tried building a machine for typesetting, but this was a failure and he quickly abandoned the idea. He arrived at the typewriter through a different route. His initial goal was to create a machine to number pages of a book, tickets and so on. He began work on this at a machine shop in Milwaukee, together with fellow printer Samuel W. Soule.  They patented a numbering machine on November 13, 1866.

Sholes and Soule showed their machine to Carlos Glidden, a lawyer and amateur inventor at the machine shop who was working on a mechanical plow.  Glidden wondered if the machine could not be made to produce letters and words as well. Further inspiration came in July 1867, when Sholes came across a short note in Scientific American describing the "Pterotype", a prototype typewriter that had been invented by John Pratt. From the description, Sholes decided that the Pterotype was too complex and set out to make his own machine, whose name he got from the article: the typewriting machine, or typewriter.

For this project, Soule was again enlisted and Glidden joined them as a third partner to provide funding. The Scientific American article (unillustrated) had figuratively used the phrase "literary piano"; the first model that the trio built had a keyboard literally resembling a piano. It had black keys and white keys, laid out in two rows. It did not contain keys for the numerals 0 or 1 because the letters O and I were deemed sufficient:
  3 5 7 9 N O P Q R S T U V W X Y Z
 2 4 6 8 . A B C D E F G H I J K L M The first row was made of ivory and the second of ebony, the rest of the framework was wooden. Despite the evident prior art by Pratt, it was in this same form that Sholes, Glidden and Soule were granted patents for their invention on June 23, 1868 and July 14. The first document to be produced on a typewriter was a contract that Sholes had written, in his capacity as the comptroller for the city of Milwaukee. Machines similar to Sholes's had been previously used by the blind for embossing, but by Sholes's time the inked ribbon had been invented, which made typewriting in its current form possible.
At this stage, the Sholes-Glidden-Soule typewriter was only one among dozens of similar inventions. They wrote hundreds of letters on their machine to various people, one of whom was James Densmore of Meadville, Pennsylvania. Densmore believed that the typewriter would be highly profitable, and offered to buy a share of the patent, without even having seen the machine. The trio immediately sold him one-fourth of the patent in return for his paying all their expenses so far. When Densmore eventually examined the machine in March 1867, he declared that it was good for nothing in its current form, and urged them to start improving it. Discouraged, Soule and Glidden left the project, leaving Sholes and Densmore in sole possession of the patent.

Realizing that stenographers would be among the first and most important users of the machine, and therefore best in a position to judge its suitability, they sent experimental versions to a few stenographers. The most important of them was James O. Clephane of Washington D.C., who tried the instruments as no one else had tried them, subjecting them to such unsparing tests that he destroyed them, one after another, as fast as they could be made and sent to him. His judgments were similarly caustic, causing Sholes to lose his patience and temper. But Densmore insisted that this was exactly what they needed:

Sholes took this advice and set to improve the machine at every iteration, until they were satisfied that Clephane had taught them everything he could. By this time, they had manufactured 50 machines or so, at an average cost of $250 (equivalent to almost $5,000 in 2020). They decided to have the machine examined by an expert mechanic, who directed them to E. Remington and Sons (which later became the Remington Arms Company), manufacturers of firearms, sewing machines and farm tools. In early 1873, they approached Remington, who decided to buy the patent from them. Sholes sold his half for $12,000, while Densmore, still a stronger believer in the machine, insisted on a royalty, which would eventually fetch him $1.5 million.

Sholes returned to Milwaukee and continued to work on new improvements for the typewriter throughout the 1870s, which included the QWERTY keyboard (1873). James Densmore had suggested splitting up commonly used letter combinations in order to solve a jamming problem caused by the slow method of recovering from a keystroke: weights, not springs, returned all parts to the "rest" position. This concept was later refined by Sholes and the resulting QWERTY layout is still used today on both typewriters and English language computer keyboards, although the jamming problem no longer exists.

Sholes died on February 17, 1890, after battling tuberculosis for nine years. He is buried at Forest Home Cemetery in Milwaukee.

Notes

References 
 
 
 
 
 
 
 
  Reprinted by Post-era Books, Arcadia, CA, 1985.

 Who invented the typewriter?
 Sholes and Glidden typewriter

External links 

Christopher Latham Sholes, The Wisconsin State Historical Society

Sholes Visible typewriter at the Martin Howard Collection

|-

|-

|-

|-

1819 births
1890 deaths
19th-century American newspaper editors
American anti–death penalty activists
19th-century American inventors
Members of the Wisconsin State Assembly
Politicians from Milwaukee
People from Montour County, Pennsylvania
Typewriters
Wisconsin Democrats
Wisconsin Free Soilers
19th-century American politicians
Wisconsin Republicans
Wisconsin state senators
American male journalists
19th-century American male writers
Journalists from Pennsylvania